Richard Fitzgerald (November 18, 1920 – April 13, 1968) was an American professional basketball player.

A 6'2" forward from Fordham University, Fitzgerald played parts of two seasons (1946–47; 1947–48) in the Basketball Association of America as a member of the Toronto Huskies and Providence Steamrollers. He averaged 4.5 points in 61 games. He also served as interim player-coach of the Huskies for three games in his first season, after the team's previous player-coach, Ed Sadowski, expressed dissatisfaction with his role on the team. Fitzgerald posted a 2–1 record. After the Huskies dispersed at the end of the 1946–47 season, Fitzgerald was selected by the Providence Steamrollers in the dispersal draft, but only played one game with the team.

Fitzgerald's brother, Bob, also played in the BAA, and the two were teammates on the Huskies, before Bob was traded to the New York Knicks midseason.

BAA career statistics

Regular season

References

External links

1920 births
1968 deaths
American expatriate basketball people in Canada
American men's basketball players
Basketball players from New York City
Fordham Rams men's basketball players
Forwards (basketball)
Player-coaches
Providence Steamrollers players
Sportspeople from Queens, New York
Toronto Huskies coaches
Toronto Huskies players